George Duncan Chaplin (26 September 1888 – 14 May 1963) was a Scottish footballer who played as a full-back. He played professionally for various clubs in Scotland and England, and also made one senior international appearance for Scotland.

Career
Born in Dundee, Chaplin played for Dundee, Bradford City and Coventry City. For Bradford City, he made 88 appearances in the Football League; he also made nine FA Cup appearances. He missed two seasons through tuberculosis, but made a full recovery to spend a decade with Bradford. His career was brought to an end in 1923 (although he was already 34 by that stage) when he was implicated in a match fixing scandal from three years earlier when it was found Bury had accepted payments from Coventry to prevent the latter's relegation, and Chaplin was banned for life along with several others.

His single international appearance came for Scotland against Wales on 7 March 1908, when Chaplin was only 19 years old. His performance was criticised in a match report which claimed: "Chaplin fell short of requirements at left back."

Personal life
His brothers were fellow professional players Jack Chaplin and Alex Chaplin.

See also
 List of Scottish football families 
 Match fixing in English football

References

1888 births
Footballers from Dundee
1963 deaths
Scottish footballers
Dundee F.C. players
Bradford City A.F.C. players
Coventry City F.C. players
Scottish Junior Football Association players
Scottish Football League players
English Football League players
Association football fullbacks
Scotland international footballers
Place of death missing